Grabrić is a census-designated naselje (settlement) in the Gradec municipality of Zagreb County, Croatia. It has 85 people according to the 2001 census. Expressways B28 and B41 have an interchange near Grabrić.

Populated places in Zagreb County